Walter Thomas Layton, 1st Baron Layton  (15 March 1884 – 14 February 1966), was a British economist, editor, newspaper proprietor and Liberal Party politician.

Background and education
Layton was the son of Alfred John Layton of Woking, Surrey, and Mary Johnson. He was educated at King's College School, Westminster City School, University College, London and Trinity College, Cambridge.

Career
He became a lecturer in economics at Trinity College, Cambridge in 1908, then from 1909 to 1914 he was a Fellow of Gonville and Caius College. A notable economist, Layton worked for the Ministry of Munitions during the First World War. In 1922 he was appointed editor of The Economist, a post he held until 1938, and from 1944 to 1963 was also Chairman of The Economist Newspaper Ltd. His editorship was of profound importance to the newspaper, and he was probably the person to whom it owes most thanks for its survival and continued independence. He was editorial director of the News Chronicle (1930–40), and returned to the Chronicle after the war, where he remained until the newspaper ceased publication in 1960.

He was a member of the Liberal Party committee that produced Britain's Industrial Future, otherwise known as the Liberal Yellow Book. He stood as a Liberal Parliamentary candidate, contesting the London University seat in 1929. Layton was again drafted in to work for the government during the Second World War, holding positions in the Ministry of Supply (from May 1940) and the Ministry of Production. Head of Joint War Production Staff 1942 to 1943. After the war, he served as Vice-President of the Parliamentary Assembly of the Council of Europe from 1949 to 1957.

Honours
Layton was made a CBE in 1917 and a Companion of Honour in 1919. He was knighted in 1930 and in 1947 he was raised to the peerage as Baron Layton, of Danehill in the County of Sussex.

Liberal politics
Layton stood unsuccessfully for parliament three times as a Liberal. He fought Burnley in 1922, Cardiff South in 1923 and in 1929 he switched again to fight the London University seat. However, Layton's importance in Liberal politics had much more to do with his work at the News Chronicle and The Economist where he became a prominent member of a group of Liberals who had a major influence on public opinion. Their orbits were the Whitehall and Westminster villages. They moved in Fleet Street, the City, and Oxbridge circles. Among their contemporaries were Maynard Keynes, William Beveridge, Gilbert Murray, and Seebohm Rowntree. Layton would later chair the executive committee of the Liberal Industrial Inquiry which produced the celebrated Yellow Book of 1928.

Marriage and children
Lord Layton married Eleanor Dorothea Osmaston, daughter of Francis Beresford Plumptre Osmaston, in 1910. They had seven children:
 The Hon. Margaret Dorothea Layton MA (13 March 1911 – 5 July 1962), married Alfred Geiringer (1911-1996) of Reuters, four children
 Michael John Layton, 2nd Baron Layton (28 September 1912 – 23 January 1989), married Dorothy Rose Cross (1916-1994), two children
 Lt. Col. the Hon. David Layton MBE BA (5 July 1914 – 31 July 2009), educ. Gresham's School and Cambridge University, married (1) (Joan) Elizabeth Gray, three children; married (2) Joy Parkinson (d. 2013)
 The Hon. Jean Mary Layton (14 April 1916 – 8 July 2017), violinist and music therapist, 100th birthday marked by Classic FM in 2016, married Paul Eisler (d.1966), two children
 The Hon. Olive Shirley Layton (18 December 1918 – 22 June 2009), actress, married Peter Gellhorn, composer and conductor (1912-2004), four children
 The Hon. (Elizabeth) Ruth Frances Layton (27 April 1923 – 4 June 2016), served in ATS, married Edward Gutierrez Pegna (1919-2009), four children
 The Hon. Christopher Walter Layton (born 31 December 1929), married (1) Anneliese Margaret von Thadden, two children; married (2) Margaret Ann Moon, three children; married (3) Wendy Elizabeth Christine Bartlett, one child

Layton died in February 1966, aged 81, and was succeeded in the barony by his eldest son. Great great grandfather to SP.

References

Further reading
Hubback, David. No Ordinary Press Baron: A Life of Walter Layton, Weidenfeld & Nicolson, 1985
Grayson, Richard S. Walter Layton in Brack & Randall (eds.) The Dictionary of Liberal Thought, Politico's Publishing, 2007 pp206–208
Grayson, Richard S. Walter Thomas Layton in Oxford Dictionary of National Biography OUP, 2004–09
Kidd, Charles, Williamson, David (editors). Debrett's Peerage and Baronetage (1990 edition). New York: St Martin's Press, 1990, 
Layton, Christopher. Walter Layton (Lord Layton) in Brack et al. (eds.) Dictionary of Liberal Biography, Politico's Publishing 1998 pp217–219
Oxbury, Harold. Great Britons: Twentieth Century Lives. Oxford University Press, 1984.

External links
  Photograph (1953-01-10): Jean Monnet and Lord Layton on European NAvigator
 

1884 births
1966 deaths
Alumni of University College London
British magazine editors
Commanders of the Order of the British Empire
Fellows of Gonville and Caius College, Cambridge
Knights Bachelor
Liberal Party (UK) hereditary peers
Members of the Order of the Companions of Honour
People educated at King's College School, London
People educated at Westminster City School
The Economist editors
Liberal Party (UK) parliamentary candidates
Barons created by George VI